Sara Errani and Roberta Vinci were the defending champions, but lost in the final to Ekaterina Makarova and Elena Vesnina 5–7, 2–6.

Seeds

Main draw

Finals

Top half

Section 1

Section 2

Bottom half

Section 3

Section 4

References

External links 

2013 French Open – Women's draws and results at the International Tennis Federation

Women's Doubles
French Openandnbsp;- Women's Doubles
French Open by year – Women's doubles
2013 in women's tennis
2013 in French women's sport